Gosselies is a town of Wallonia and a district of the municipality of Charleroi, located in the province of Hainaut, Belgium. 

Located in the north of Charleroi, it was a city and a municipality of its own before the merger of the municipalities in 1977. Gosselies was the home of the headquarters of Caterpillar Belgium, as well as Solar Turbines Europe. The Brussels South Charleroi Airport (BSCA) is located in Gosselies too.

On the pre-metro line M3, opened in June 2013, there are nine stations located in Gosselies. Since this date, Gosselies has been re-connected with the center of Charleroi and the SNCB Charleroi-South railway station by tram.

Sights 
The tower of the former castle of Bousies family.

People born in Gosselies 

 Jean-Pierre Lecocq (1947–1992), molecular biologist and entrepreneur

References

Sub-municipalities of Charleroi
Former municipalities of Hainaut (province)